IMA or Ima may refer to:

Education
 Indian Military Academy, Dehradun
 Instituto Miguel Ángel, a school in Mexico City

Galleries and museums
 Indianapolis Museum of Art, Indiana, US
 Institut du Monde Arabe, Paris, France
 Islamic Museum of Australia, Melbourne, Australia

Medicine
 Ideomotor apraxia, a neurological disorder
 Inferior mesenteric artery
 Thyroid ima artery

Music
 Ima (BT album), 1995
 Ima (Yvette Tollar album), 2008
 Ima, a 2002 album by Ima
 "Ima", a song by Bimi Ombale

Organizations
 I Monetary Advisory, former Indian company
 Illinois Manufacturers' Association
 Illinois Mycological Association
 IMA (company) (Industria Macchine Automatiche S.p.A.), Bologna, Italy
 Indian Medical Association
 Institut du Monde Arabe (Arab World Institute), in Paris
 Institute for Mathematics and its Applications at the University of Minnesota
 Institute of Mathematics and its Applications, UK
 Institute of Mathematics and Applications, Bhubaneswar, India
 Institute of Management Accountants, U.S.
 International Marinelife Alliance, marine conservation
 International Mineralogical Association
 International Mycological Association
 Interactive Multimedia Association, former audio algorithm company
 Investment Management Association, UK
 Irish Medical Organisation, formerly Irish Medical Association
 Irish Museums Association
 Israel Medical Association

People
 Ima, a diminutive of the Russian male given name Avim
 Ima (singer) (born 1978), Canadian singer
 Ima Hogg (1882–1975), known as "The First Lady of Texas"

Places
 Ima Lake, a lake in Minnesota

Technology
 Ideal mechanical advantage of a mechanical device
 IMA (file format), file extension for disk image
 Integrated modular avionics,  airborne computer network
 Integrated Motor Assist, Honda hybrid car technology
 Inverse Multiplexing for ATM, a data technology
 iSCSI Management API

Other
 Individual Mobilization Augmentee in USAF reserve
 Ima, a praying mantids genus in Nanomantidae

See also